William Joseph Baldwin (born February 21, 1963) is an American actor. A member of the Baldwin family, he is the second-youngest Baldwin of the four Baldwin brothers. He has starred in the films Flatliners (1990), Backdraft (1991), Sliver (1993), Virus (1999), The Squid and the Whale (2005), Forgetting Sarah Marshall, in which he portrayed himself, and the Netflix show Northern Rescue (2019). Baldwin is married to singer Chynna Phillips.

Early life
Baldwin was born in Massapequa, New York, the son of Carol Newcomb (née Martineau), founder of The Baldwin Fund and Alexander Rae Baldwin Jr. His father was a high school history/social studies teacher and football coach. He is the brother of actors Alec, Daniel, and Stephen, sometimes collectively known as the Baldwin brothers, and of sisters Beth and Jane, all together known as the Baldwin family. Baldwin was raised in a Catholic family, and has Irish and French ancestry. A graduate of Alfred G. Berner High School and Binghamton University, where he was a varsity wrestler, he has a degree in political science.

Career

1980s
Before starting his acting career, Baldwin was a fashion model for Calvin Klein. His first starring role was in a TV movie as Robert Chambers, alongside Danny Aiello and Lara Flynn Boyle in The Preppie Murder, which aired on ABC in 1989.  Baldwin also appeared in the 1989 film Born on the Fourth of July, starring Tom Cruise, where he had a minor role as a U.S Marine during the Vietnam War. His brothers Daniel and Stephen also had minor parts in the film.

1990s
Baldwin's first featured film was Internal Affairs, in which he starred alongside Richard Gere and Andy García. He then starred in big-budget films such as Flatliners with stars such as Julia Roberts, Kiefer Sutherland and Kevin Bacon. He portrayed Chicago firefighter Brian McCaffrey in Backdraft with Kurt Russell and also with an ensemble cast including Donald Sutherland, Scott Glenn, Rebecca De Mornay, and Robert De Niro. His role in 1993 film Sliver along with Sharon Stone earned him the MTV Movie Award for Most Desirable Male.

In 1995, among other diverse characters he has played in his career, Baldwin was on Joel Schumacher's shortlist for Batman Forever to play the title character; Schumacher's four diverse choices were Daniel Day-Lewis, Ralph Fiennes, Val Kilmer and Baldwin. The role went to Val Kilmer. Baldwin starred alongside Cindy Crawford in Fair Game. Then in 1996, he starred in a low-budget film by Miramax Films titled Curdled and was paid US$150,000 for his performance, compared to the $1.7 million he received for his role in Sliver; his performance in the film was slightly acclaimed by critics. In 1998, he appeared in Warren Beatty's film Bulworth as Constance Bulworth's lover. In 1999, Baldwin teamed up with Jamie Lee Curtis and Donald Sutherland for the science fiction thriller Virus and played alongside Peter Gallagher in the Showtime original movie, Brotherhood of Murder.

2000s

In 2001, Baldwin played a leading role in the television film Double Bang which aired on HBO. Since then, Baldwin has played in other projects such as Red Rover in 2003, Park, Feel and Lenexa, 1 Mile in 2006, and Adrift in Manhattan, A Plumm Summer, Noise, and Humble Pie in 2007. His 2004 film Art Heist received much attention when it was released on DVD. Baldwin has continued to act in films and on television, but has not taken many leading roles. He was well received in a supporting role in the 2005 film The Squid and the Whale alongside Laura Linney and Jeff Daniels, for which he earned the Gotham Independent Film Award for Best Ensemble Cast. He also co-starred in ABC's Dirty Sexy Money as Donald Sutherland's oldest son, Patrick Darling IV, for the duration of the show until April 2009. In 2008, he appeared in the comedy film Forgetting Sarah Marshall, which stars Jason Segel and Kristen Bell, as Detective Hunter Rush.

2010s
In February 2010, Baldwin played Batman in Justice League: Crisis on Two Earths, a loose adaptation of Grant Morrison's JLA: Earth 2 story. Baldwin portrayed Dr. Willam van der Woodsen, father of Serena and Eric van der Woodsen, on the third and fourth seasons of Gossip Girl. Baldwin was also featured with his brother Daniel in UniGlobe Entertainment's breast cancer docudrama, 1 a Minute. The documentary was made by Namrata Singh Gujral, and features breast cancer survivors Olivia Newton-John, Diahann Carroll, Melissa Etheridge, Namrata Singh Gujral, Mumtaz,  Jaclyn Smith, Daniel Baldwin and Priya Dutt. Baldwin was cast in the second season of Parenthood, which aired Fall 2010. He played Gordon Flint: a charismatic bachelor, the boss of Adam Braverman (Peter Krause) and a love-interest for Adam's sister, Sarah (Lauren Graham). In 2011, Baldwin starred in the Lifetime Original Movie, The Craigslist Killer which aired January 3, 2011. He played the lead detective on the case of the killer, Philip Markoff, who connected with victims through Craigslist ads placed in Boston, Massachusetts.

On June 1, 2011, Baldwin starred in the indie film Sexy Evil Genius, alongside Seth Green, Harold Perrineau Jr., Katee Sackhoff and Michelle Trachtenberg. The film was directed by Shawn Piller. In July 2011, Baldwin joined the CBS drama Hawaii Five-0 for a multi-episode arc. On March 22, 2012, Baldwin guest starred on the NBC show 30 Rock. Baldwin plays Lance Drake Mandrell, an actor who plays Jack Donaghy – the role played in the series by Baldwin's real-life brother Alec – in a made-for-TV movie within the show.
Baldwin is currently a model for Sacoor Brothers. Baldwin appeared in the fourth and final season of Wilfred, replacing Dwight Yoakam in the role of Bruce. In 2015, he narrated for the documentary A Wing and a Prayer, a film about American fighter pilots who assisted in the 1948 Arab–Israeli War and the founding of the Israeli Air Force.

In 2016, Baldwin signed on and currently has a recurring role on the 2016 reboot of the television series MacGyver as Elwood Davis, Riley's estranged father on CBS Television Studios. On November 21, 2017 Baldwin joined the main cast on a television series along with Miles Teller in Too Old To Die Young which was released in the summer of 2019 on Amazon Video. Currently, Baldwin stars and executive produces Northern Rescue, a Canadian drama television series produced by CBC Television distributed internationally on Netflix. The first season of 10 episodes debuted on March 1, 2019.

2020s
In 2021, Baldwin starred in War of the Worlds: Annihilation. Baldwin appeared in the horror film Candyland (2022).

Personal life
In 1995, Baldwin married singer Chynna Phillips of the music group Wilson Phillips, daughter of musician John Phillips and Michelle Gilliam. Together, they have three children, daughters Jameson (born in 2000) and Brooke (born in 2004) and son Vance (born in 2001).

Baldwin splits his time between an estate in Santa Barbara, California, and another in Bedford Corners, New York, which is 30 minutes away from his brother Stephen's estate in Nyack, New York.

In December 2022, as part of the Twitter files disclosures, it was revealed that on November 6, 2022, the FBI's National Election Command Post requested that Twitter take action with regard to Baldwin's Twitter account, along with 24 others, saying that it was "being utilized to spread disinformation about the upcoming election." Twitter responded on 8 November, having chosen not to take any action.

Filmography

Film

Television

References

External links

 
 
 
 William Baldwin official website

William
1963 births
American male film actors
American male television actors
American male voice actors
Male models from New York (state)
American people of French descent
American people of Irish descent
Binghamton University alumni
Living people
Male actors from New York (state)
New York (state) Democrats
20th-century American male actors
21st-century American male actors
Wilson Phillips
People from Massapequa, New York
Berner High School alumni